Saeid Baghvardani is a retired Iranian-American soccer player who played professionally in the North American Soccer League, United Soccer League and SISL.

Baghvardani attended Southern Methodist University where he was a 1979 and 1980 First Team All American soccer player.

He played one game for the Chicago Sting during the 1983–1984 North American Soccer League indoor season.  In the summer of 1984, he played for the Dallas Americans of the United Soccer League.  In 1989, he played for the Richardson Rockets in the Southwest Independent Soccer League.

Baghvardani coached the SMU Mustangs men's soccer team in 1989 and 1990.  He compiled a 10–12–1 record.  He also coached the Cistercian Preparatory School soccer team and the Dallas Texans U17 boys team which went to the semifinals of the 1995 U.S. Youth Soccer Championship.

He is now currently teaching at Saint Joseph Catholic School.

References

External links
 NASL stats

Living people
American soccer coaches
American soccer players
Chicago Sting (NASL) players
Dallas Americans players
Dallas Rockets players
North American Soccer League (1968–1984) indoor players
USISL players
SMU Mustangs men's soccer coaches
SMU Mustangs men's soccer players
United Soccer League (1984–85) players
All-American men's college soccer players
Association football defenders
Year of birth missing (living people)